Reliance was the 1903 America's Cup defender designed by Nat Herreshoff.

Reliance was funded by a nine member syndicate of members of the New York Yacht Club headed by Cornelius Vanderbilt III.

Reliance was designed to take full advantage of the Seawanhaka '90-foot' rating rule and was suitable only for use in certain conditions. The 1903 America's Cup was the last to be raced according to the Seawanhaka rule.

Design
The design took advantage of a loophole in the Seawanhaka  '90-foot' rating rule, to produce a racing yacht with long overhangs at each end, so that when heeled over, her waterline length (and therefore her speed) increased dramatically (see image at left).

To save weight, she was completely unfinished below deck, with exposed frames. Reliance was the first racing boat to be fitted with winches below decks, in an era when her competitors relied on sheer man-power. Despite this a crew of 64 was required for racing due to the large sail plan.

Reliance was built for one purpose: to successfully defend the America's Cup.

Career
Her racing career was extraordinarily brief – and undefeated. She bested her America's Cup challenger, Sir Thomas Lipton's Shamrock III, designed by William Fife, in all three races, with Shamrock III losing by such a margin in the third that she was forced to retire. Reliances designer, Nathanael Herreshoff, immediately proposed the Universal rating rule to avoid such extreme, dangerous and expensive vessels, which made Reliance an inadequate contestant in subsequent races. There was much speculation as to whether Reliances victory was due to the design of the yacht or the skill of Charlie Barr in sailing her. Lipton himself proposed to allow the two boats to swap crew after the race to decide the matter, but the offer was refused by the owners of Reliance. Her very successful career was short-lived, and she was sold for scrap in 1913.

References

Further reading
N. L. Stebbins, W. H. Bunting, Steamers, Schooners, Cutters and Sloops: Marine Photographs of N. L. Stebbins Taken 1884-1907 (Houghton Mifflin, Boston, 1974)
Temple to the Wind - The Story of America's Greatest Naval Architect and His Masterpiece, Reliance by Christopher Pastore (Lyons Press 2005)

External links

America's Cup defenders
Individual sailing vessels
Yachts of New York Yacht Club members
1903 ships
Sailboat type designs by Nathanael Greene Herreshoff